Camillo Tavernelli (born 10 July 1999) is an Italian football player. He plays for  club Triestina on loan from Cittadella.

Club career
He was raised in the youth teams of Sansepolcro and started his senior career with the club in Serie D at the age of 16. He spent the next four seasons with the Serie C club Gubbio.

On 12 August 2020, he signed with Serie B club Cittadella. He made his Serie B debut for Cittadella on 27 September 2020 in a game against Cremonese. He substituted Frank Tsadjout in the 65th minute. He made his first start on 20 October in a game against Pordenone and scored his first goal in a 2–0 home victory.

On 31 August 2022, Tavernelli joined Novara on loan. On 20 January 2023, he moved on a new loan to Triestina, with an option to buy.

References

External links
 

1999 births
People from Città di Castello
Sportspeople from the Province of Perugia
Footballers from Umbria
Living people
Italian footballers
Association football forwards
A.S. Gubbio 1910 players
A.S. Cittadella players
Novara F.C. players
U.S. Triestina Calcio 1918 players
Serie B players
Serie C players
Serie D players